Michaely Kyria Bihina (born 28 December 2003) is a Cameroonian footballer who plays as a goalkeeper for Éclair de Sa’a and the Cameroon women's national team.

Club career
Bihina has played for Éclair de Sa’a in Cameroon.

International career
Bihina capped for Cameroon at senior level during the 2020 Summer Olympics qualification (CAF–CONMEBOL play-off).

References

2003 births
Living people
Cameroonian women's footballers
Women's association football goalkeepers
Cameroon women's international footballers